Carnival of the Spirits is an album by Brazilian composer Moacir Santos recorded in 1975 and released on the Blue Note label.

Track listing
All compositions by Moacir Santos except as indicated
 "Quiet Carnival" (Moacir Santos, Mike Campbell) - 5:52  
 "Jequie" - 2:53  
 "Kamba" - 4:30  
 "Sampaguita" (Graham Dee, Jack Keller, Lora Kaye) - 3:08  
 "Coisa No. 2" - 4:38  
 "Tomorrow Is Mine" (Santos, Campbell) - 3:31  
 "Route ∞"  3:32  
 "Anon" - 4:13 
Recorded at The Record Plant in Los Angeles, California on March 17 (tracks 5 & 6), March 18 (tracks 3 & 7), March 19 (tracks 1 & 8) and March 20 (tracks 2 & 4), 1975

Personnel
Moacir Santos - vocals, alto saxophone, baritone saxophone, percussion, arranger
Oscar Brashear, Mike Price, Jerry Rusch - trumpet
George Bohanon, J.J. Johnson - trombone
David Duke - french horn
Ernie Watts - bass flute
Jerome Richardson - soprano saxophone, alto flute
Ray Pizzi - soprano saxophone, clarinet, bass clarinet
Gary Foster - alto saxophone
Don Menza - tenor saxophone, flute, alto flute
Clare Fischer - piano
Jerry Peters - organ
Larry Nash - electric piano, clavinet
Dennis Budimir, Dean Parks - guitar
Chuck Domanico - bass
Harvey Mason - drums
Louis Alves, Paulinho Da Costa, Roberto Silva - percussion
Lynda Lawrence - vocals 
Dale Oehler - arranger

References

Blue Note Records albums
Moacir Santos albums
1975 albums